The Worcestershire flag is the flag of the county of Worcestershire. It was registered with the Flag Institute on 8 April 2013 as the winning entry of a BBC Hereford & Worcester competition. It was first flown in a ceremony at Worcester Cathedral on the same day.



Design
Designed by Elaine Truby, the flag features the county's famed black pear (black worcester pear) – a symbol reported to have been used by Worcestershire units at the Battle of Agincourt.  Additionally a pear tree is seen on the local council's arms.  Three of these pears are seen on a shield charged against a wavy green and blue background. These latter colours symbolise the verdant flood plain of the River Severn as it runs through the county. The dark green hue is that worn by the county's cricket team.

The flag was created after a competition was launched in 2013 by radio station BBC Hereford & Worcester, to create an official flag for the county after it was discovered Worcestershire didn't have one.

Armorial banner
An alternate flag offered for sale commercially is a banner of the arms of Worcestershire County Council and as such is the property of the council and only represents it, not the wider county. In the absence of an adopted flag at the time, this council flag had been flown alongside the Union Flag above the Department for Communities and Local Government.

References

External links
[ Flag Institute – Worcestershire]

Worcestershire
Worcestershire
Worcestershire